Trachysomus peregrinus is a species of beetle in the family Cerambycidae. It was described by James Thomson in 1858. It is known from Brazil, Panama and French Guiana.

References

Onciderini
Beetles described in 1858